Chail is a constituency of the Uttar Pradesh Legislative Assembly covering the city of Chail in the Kaushambi district of Uttar Pradesh, India.

Chail is one of five assembly constituencies in the Kaushambi Lok Sabha constituency. Since 2008, this assembly constituency is numbered 253 amongst 403 constituencies.

Currently this seat belongs to Samajwadi Party candidate Pooja Pal who won in last Assembly election of 2022 Uttar Pradesh Legislative Elections defeating Apna Dal (Sonelal) candidate Nagendra Pratap Singh Patel by a margin of 13,209 votes.

Election results

2022

References

External links
 

Assembly constituencies of Uttar Pradesh
Kaushambi district